Mikhaylovsky Uyezd (Миха́йловский уе́зд) was one of the subdivisions of the Ryazan Governorate of the Russian Empire. It was situated in the western part of the governorate. Its administrative centre was Mikhaylov.

Demographics
At the time of the Russian Empire Census of 1897, Mikhaylovsky Uyezd had a population of 151,709. Of these, 100.0% spoke Russian as their native language.

References

 
Uezds of Ryazan Governorate
Ryazan Governorate